Walnutwood High School is an alternative school of choice (grades K-12) located in Rancho Cordova, Sacramento County, California, United States.

School History

Walnutwood High School is an independent study school. The school opened at the former campus of Walnutwood Elementary School in 1989.

References

High schools in Sacramento County, California
Public high schools in California
1980 establishments in California